Chervov Peak is a peak,  high, rising  north of Morkenatten Peak in the Shcherbakov Range of the Orvin Mountains, in Queen Maud Land. It was roughly plotted from air photos by the Third German Antarctic Expedition, 1938–39. It was mapped from air photos and surveys by the Sixth Norwegian Antarctic Expedition, 1956–60, remapped by the Soviet Antarctic Expedition, 1960–61, and named after Soviet geologist Ye. I. Chervov.

References 

Mountains of Queen Maud Land
Princess Astrid Coast